Yeltsy is a rural locality (a village) in Gorkinskoye Rural Settlement, Kirzhachsky District, Vladimir Oblast, Russia. The population was 589 as of 2010. There are 14 streets.

Geography 
Yeltsy is located 10 km northwest of Kirzhach (the district's administrative centre) by road. Naumovo is the nearest rural locality.

References 

Rural localities in Kirzhachsky District